Federico Proia (born 4 February 1996) is an Italian footballer who plays for  club Ascoli on loan from Vicenza as a midfielder.

Club career
He made his Serie C debut for Pistoiese on 30 January 2016 in a game against SPAL.

On 12 July 2017, he was loaned to Serie C club Bassano on a season-long loan.

On 13 July 2018 he was signed by Cittadella on a permanent basis.

On 17 July 2021, he signed a three-year contract with Vicenza. On 31 January 2022, Proia moved on loan to Brescia. On 19 August 2022, Proia was loaned to SPAL with a conditional obligation to buy. On 23 January 2023, he moved on a new loan to Ascoli, with an option to buy.

References

External links
 

1996 births
Footballers from Rome
Living people
Italian footballers
Association football midfielders
A.C.N. Siena 1904 players
U.S. Pistoiese 1921 players
Bassano Virtus 55 S.T. players
A.S. Cittadella players
L.R. Vicenza players
Brescia Calcio players
S.P.A.L. players
Ascoli Calcio 1898 F.C. players
Serie B players
Serie C players